A medicine ball (also known as an exercise ball, a med ball, or a fitness ball) is a weighted ball whose diameter is about a shoulder-width, (approx. ), often used for rehabilitation and strength training. The medicine ball also serves an important role in the field of sports medicine to improve strength and neuromuscular coordination. It is distinct from the inflated exercise ball, which is much lighter and larger (up to  diameter).

Medicine balls are usually sold as  balls and are used effectively in ballistic training to increase explosive power in athletes in all sports, e.g. throwing the medicine ball or jumping whilst holding it.

History

Hippocrates is said to have stuffed animal skins for patients to toss for medicinal purposes. Similar large balls were used in Persia in 1705.  The term "medicine ball" dates back to at least 1876, in American Gymnasia and Academic Record, by Robert Jenkins Roberts Jr. The first known photograph of a medicine ball in the United States was taken in 1866 and shows Harvard athletic instructor Aaron Molyneaux Hewlett surrounded by his equipment.

See also
 Dumbbell
 Exercise ball
 Hooverball
 Kettlebell
 Medicine ball cabinet

References

External links

Balls
Exercise equipment